The papal conclaves of August 1978 and of October 1978 were respectively convened to elect a pope, the leader of the Catholic Church, to succeed Paul VI and John Paul I following their respective deaths on 6 August 1978 and on 28 September 1978. In accordance with the apostolic constitution Romano Pontifici eligendo, which governed the vacancy of the Holy See, only cardinals who had not passed their 80th birthday on the day on which the conclave began (in these cases, cardinals who were born on or after 25 August 1898 for the first conclave, and on or after 14 October 1898 for the second conclave) were eligible to participate. Although not formal requirements, the cardinal electors invariably elected the pope from among their number and did so by secret ballot. Due to the brief duration between the conclaves, the respective lists of cardinal electors are nearly identical.

Of the 129 members of the Sacred College of Cardinals at the time of the beginning of the first conclave, there were 114 cardinal electors who were eligible to participate. Three cardinal electors did not participate, decreasing the number in attendance to 111. Two cardinals, both cardinal electors, died in the time between the conclaves. Of the 126 members of the Sacred College of Cardinals at the time of the beginning of the second conclave, there were 111 cardinal electors who were eligible to participate; all of whom were in attendance.

Of the 112 cardinal electors who attended at least one of the two conclaves, 5 were cardinal bishops, 92 were cardinal priests, and 15 were cardinal deacons; 3 had been created cardinals by Pope Pius XII, 8 by Pope John XXIII, and 101 by Pope Paul VI; 28 worked in the service of the Holy See (such as in the Roman Curia), 77 were in pastoral ministry outside Rome, and 10 had retired. Another 15 cardinals were ineligible to participate in either conclave, for reasons of age.

The cardinal electors entered the Sistine Chapel to begin the first conclave on 25 August 1978. On 26 August, after four ballots over two days, they elected Cardinal Albino Luciani, Patriarch of Venice, who took the papal name John Paul I. After his death 33 days into his papacy, the cardinal electors again entered the Sistine Chapel to begin the second conclave on 14 October. On 16 October, after eight ballots over three days, they elected Cardinal Karol Wojtyła, Archbishop of Kraków, who took the papal name John Paul II.

Cardinal electors 
The Sacred College of Cardinals is divided into three orders – cardinal bishops (CB), cardinal priests (CP) and cardinal deacons (CD) – with formal precedence in that sequence. This was the order in which the cardinal electors entered the conclave, took the oath and cast their ballots. For cardinal bishops (except the Eastern Catholic patriarchs), the dean is first in precedence, followed by the vice-dean and then by the remainder in order of appointment as cardinal bishops. For cardinal bishops who are Eastern Catholic patriarchs, cardinal priests, and cardinal deacons, precedence is determined by the date of the consistory in which they were created cardinals and then by the order in which they appeared in the official announcement or bulletin.

Two of the cardinal electors in the 1978 conclaves were from the Eastern Catholic Churches: Stéphanos I Sidarouss (Coptic) and Joseph Parecattil (Syro-Malabar). In both conclaves, the senior cardinal bishop, the senior cardinal priest, the senior cardinal deacon and the junior cardinal deacon were, respectively, Jean Villot, Giuseppe Siri, Pericle Felici and Mario Luigi Ciappi. Villot was also the camerlengo of the Holy Roman Church, in charge of administering the Holy See during its vacancy.

The 112 cardinal electors in the table below are those who participated in at least one of the two conclaves. Two cardinals participated in only one: Albino Luciani, elected Pope John Paul I in the first conclave and whose death prompted the second conclave; and John Joseph Wright, who did not participate in the first conclave for health reasons owing to surgery. Another two cardinal electors did not participate in the first conclave; both died before the second conclave began. The data below are as of 25 August 1978 or 14 October 1978, the respective dates on which the conclaves began. Age ranges are given for some cardinals in the case of any differences in age as at the beginning of the two conclaves. All cardinals are of the Latin Church unless otherwise stated. Cardinals belonging to institutes of consecrated life or to societies of apostolic life are indicated by the relevant post-nominal letters.

Not in attendance

Cardinal electors by continent and by country 
The 112 attending cardinal electors in either conclave were from 49 countries on all six inhabited continents. The countries with the greatest number of cardinal electors were Italy (twenty-six in the first conclave, twenty-five in the second conclave), the United States (eight in the first conclave, nine in the second conclave; excluding Puerto Rico) and France (seven in both conclaves).

See also 
 Cardinals created by Pius XII
 Cardinals created by John XXIII
 Cardinals created by Paul VI
 Cardinal electors in the 1963 papal conclave
 Cardinal electors in the 2005 papal conclave

Notes

References

Sources 

 
 

1978
Pope Paul VI
Pope John Paul I
Pope John Paul II